Lieutenant Colonel Hugh L. Mills Jr. is a retired United States Army officer who served in the Vietnam War.

Early life
He was one of four children born to Hugh L. Mills, an educator, and his wife Don McCollum Mills in Hot Springs, Arkansas.

He graduated from Hot Springs High School in 1966.

Military career
Mills enlisted in the Army on 1 February 1967 and after attending Officer Candidate School at Fort Knox was commissioned as an armor officer on 15 December 1967. He was then assigned as a training officer with the 15th Reconnaissance Squadron. He completed Army aviation training in late 1968.

Mills arrived in South Vietnam in January 1969, and was assigned to D Troop, 1st Squadron, 4th Cavalry Regiment, 1st Infantry Division, first flying UH-1 Hueys before transitioning to the OH-6A Cayuse and becoming scout platoon commander. Major General Albert E. Milloy, commanding general of the 1st Infantry Division described Mills as “the most courageous small unit leader in the First Infantry Division with the highest kill ratio of any combat unit in the Big Red One."

Following his first tour in South Vietnam Mills served with 2nd Battalion, 64th Armor Regiment, 3rd Infantry Division, in West Germany. In September 1971 he returned to South Vietnam flying the AH-1G Cobra gunship with D Troop, 3rd Squadron, 5th Cavalry Regiment and then flew OH-6As as platoon commander of C Troop, 16th Cavalry Regiment, 1st Aviation Brigade. On 30 January 1972 his AH-1 was shot down as it attempted to attack a People's Army of Vietnam (PAVN) antiaircraft artillery site in northwest Quảng Trị Province, he and his gunner were rescued after a day on the ground trapped in the wreckage.

He flew over 2000 combat hours in the OH-6 and more than 1300 combat hours in the AH-1 in Vietnam. He was shot down 16 times, 15 times in the OH-6.

On his return to the U.S. he served with the 2nd Squadron, 1st Cavalry Regiment, 2nd Armored Division, at Fort Hood, Texas and then with the 8th Aviation Battalion (Attack Helicopter) in West Germany.

In 1975 he received a Bachelor of Arts in aeronautical studies from Embry–Riddle Aeronautical University. In 1978 he was assigned to the aviation unit that would become 160th Special Operations Aviation Regiment (Airborne). In 1980 he received a masters of public administration from Central Michigan University. His final posting was as Army representative to the Federal Aviation Administration.

Later life
After retiring from the Army in 1993 he co-wrote the book Low Level Hell about his experiences as a scout pilot in South Vietnam.

He worked for Cedar Fair for 15 years as director of general services. He also flew helicopters for the Kansas City Police Department. He later became Undersheriff with the Jackson County Missouri Sheriff's office.

In 2015 he returned to Vietnam to research a sequel to his book and met members of the PAVN unit that had shot him down in 1972. The trip was also part of a planned documentary film.

Decorations
His decorations include the Silver Star (3), Legion of Merit, Distinguished Flying Cross (4), Bronze Star (3), Purple Heart (3), Air Medal (7), Gallantry Cross with Silver Star and Palm, Armed Forces Honor Medal First Class and the Civil Actions Medal First Class.

Honors
In 2011 he was inducted into the Army Aviation Hall of Fame.

In 2013 he was added to the Arkansas Walk of Fame. 

The United States Army Aviation Museum’s OH-6 is painted in the colors of Mills' Miss Clawd IV (his OH-6A when he was with C Troop, 16th Cavalry).

References

United States Army personnel of the Vietnam War
Year of birth missing (living people)
Living people
Recipients of the Silver Star